Cyprus has a total of 108 dams and reservoirs, with a total water storage capacity of about 330,000,000 m3. Dams remain the principal source of water both for domestic and agricultural use. Water desalination plants are gradually being constructed in order to deal with recent years of prolonged drought.

List of the largest dams and reservoirs in Cyprus in decreasing order of capacity:

Notes

External links
 Current water storage levels

Cyprus
Dams and reservoirs
Dams

Dams